Gelechia nervosella is a moth of the family Gelechiidae. It is found in southern France, Spain and Morocco.

References

Moths described in 1927
Gelechia